The Endangered Wildlife Trust (EWT) is a non-governmental, not-for-profit South African conservation organisation. Founded in 1973, the EWT has an expanding footprint throughout southern and East Africa, focusing on the conservation of threatened species and ecosystems. The EWT implements research and conservation action programmes, implementing projects that address the threats facing species and their habitats, and support sustainable natural resource management.

EWT programmes 
 African Crane Conservation Programme (ACCP)
Birds of Prey Programme (BoPP)
Carnivore Conservation Programme (CCP)
Conservation Science Unit (CSU)
Drylands Conservation Programme (DCP)
National Business and Biodiversity Network (NBBN)
People in Conservation (PIC)
Soutpansberg Protected Area (SPA)
Threatened Amphibian Programme (TAP)
Wildlife and Energy Programme (WEP)
Wildlife and Transport Programme (WTP)
Wildlife in Trade Programme (WiT)
Vultures for Africa (VFA)

References

External links
 Endangered Wildlife Trust - Official site.

Environmental organisations based in South Africa
Wildlife conservation organizations
Environmental organizations established in 1973
1973 establishments in South Africa
Charities based in South Africa
Endangered biota of Africa